Sonja Tallis (born 24 September 1943) is an Australian actress, singer and drama teacher.

Career

Tallis began her showbiz career as a folk singer, touring as part of a duo called "Sean & Sonja", before moving onto acting. After acting in serial The Young Doctors, she had a small role in Sons and Daughters, before going onto her best-known role, as top dog, Nora Flynn, in Prisoner which she played for six months between May and November 1985. She went on to a regular role in the short-lived Crawford's series Prime Time, as Georgina Jones, in 1986. She appeared in Home and Away and McLeod's Daughters.

Tallis has taught drama, both privately and in a number of schools in Sydney.

Filmography

References

External links
 

Australian film actresses
Australian soap opera actresses
Australian folk singers
Living people
Drama teachers
1943 births
20th-century Australian actresses
20th-century Australian women singers
21st-century Australian actresses